The Ohio Regional Campus Conference was founded in 1973 and is an independent sports organization that serves the State of Ohio's regional campuses.  The ORCC has eleven members and currently fields eight sports - women's volleyball, women's basketball, men's basketball, women's softball, women's tennis, men's baseball, men's tennis, and golf (co-ed).  The ORCC does not currently have a website.

Member schools

Current members

Former members
All Ohio University branch campuses dropped sports, effective the 2021 fall semester.

Champions

Women's basketball

Women's softball

Women's tennis

Women's volleyball

Men's baseball

Men's basketball

Golf

Men's tennis

All Sports Champions

References

College sports conferences in the United States

College sports in Ohio